Media Worldwide Limited is an Indian media company based in Mumbai, India.

Owned channels

References

External links
 
Bengali music
Mass media companies of India
Companies based in Mumbai
Mass media companies established in 2005
Indian companies established in 2005
2005 establishments in Maharashtra
Television broadcasting companies of India
Television networks in India
Broadcasting